Rise to Power is the first compilation album by American rapper Rick Ross. The album was released on September 18, 2007.

The album is not intended as a follow-up to Port of Miami, but a collection of unreleased material that Ross recorded while at Suave House Records before signing to Slip-n-Slide/Def Jam.

Commercial performance
Rise to Power debuted at number 62 on the US Billboard 200 chart. In its second week, the album fell to number 164 on the Billboard 200, selling 4,000 copies, for a two-week total of 16,000 units.

Track listing

Charts

Weekly charts

References

2007 compilation albums
Rick Ross albums
Gangsta rap compilation albums